Graphik is a neo-grotesque sans-serif typeface designed by Christian Schwartz and published by Commercial Type in 2009. It is currently used as Accenture's, Snap Inc.'s,  and Sprint's official typeface. Eighteen styles are included with macOS. 

The retail version supports Latin, Cyrillic, Greek, Arabic, Armenian, Georgian, Hebrew, and Thai. In 2014 Commercial Type introduced a slab serif companion typeface, Produkt, designed by Berton Hasebe.

References 

Neo-grotesque sans-serif typefaces
Typefaces designed by Christian Schwartz
Unified serif and sans-serif typeface families